Muniganeen is a locality in the Toowoomba Region, Queensland, Australia.

History 
Muniganeen Provisional School  opened in 1904. On 1 Jan 1909 it became Muniganeen State School. It closed in 1924 due to low student numbers but reopened on 14 Feb 1927. It closed permanently circa 1950.

References 

Toowoomba Region
Localities in Queensland